A Lousy Ten Grand is a 2004 Vanguard Productions movie written by, directed and starring the stand-up comedian Kelly Monteith.

Plot summary
Ted Beckerwith (Monteith) is an unsuccessful family man who finds himself in severe debt to a loan shark (Joey Travolta). In attempt to pay off his $10,000, he becomes involved in a plan to marry a foreigner for a price.

External links
 Official website

 

2004 films
2004 comedy films
American comedy films
2000s English-language films
2000s American films